Raukaua gunnii is a species of plant in the family  Araliaceae native to Tasmania. It was previously known as Pseudopanax gunnii, but was found not to be closely related to the core members of Pseudopanax.

References

External links

gunnii
Flora of Tasmania